The Dick Tomey Legacy Game is the name given to the San José State–Hawaiʻi football rivalry. It is a college football rivalry between the San José State Spartans football team of San José State University and the Hawaiʻi Rainbow Warriors football team of the University of Hawaiʻi at Mānoa. Since 1936, the two teams have played each other 45 times, since 2019 the winner of the match receives the Dick Tomey Legacy Trophy. As of 2022, the series is tied 22-22-1.

Historical overview 
The series between San José State and Hawaiʻi began in 1936 with a game in Honolulu, which San José State won 13–8. Two years later in 1938, Hawaiʻi won their first game of the series, a 13–12 victory in Honolulu.

In 1941, the San José State Spartans football team served unexpectedly with the Honolulu Police Department during World War II. The team had just arrived in Hawaii to play a series of postseason bowl games against the Hawaii Rainbow Warriors and the Willamette University Bearcats when the U.S. Navy base at Pearl Harbor was attacked on December 7, 1941. The team was stranded on the islands for a number of weeks following the attack, and players were employed by the local police department to help improve island defenses against a possible Japanese amphibious assault and as guards for military bases on the island.

In 1996, San José State joined the Western Athletic Conference, making the pair conference rivals. In 2007, Hawaiʻi had their seventh consecutive win, the longest win-streak of the series. In 2012, Hawaiʻi moved their football team to the Mountain West Conference, they were followed by San José State the following year, allowing the teams to continue to be conference rivals.

In 2019, after the death of Dick Tomey, a former head coach for both schools, the near-annual game was renamed to the Dick Tomey Legacy Game, the winner of which would receive the Dick Tomey Legacy Trophy.

Statistics

Game results

See also 
 List of NCAA college football rivalry games

References 

College football rivalries in the United States
San Jose State Spartans football
Hawaii Rainbow Warriors football